Imaclava hotei is a species of sea snail, a marine gastropod mollusk in the family Drilliidae.

Description

Distribution
This species occurs in the demersal zone of the Northwest Pacific off Japan.

References

  Tucker, J.K. 2004 Catalog of recent and fossil turrids (Mollusca: Gastropoda). Zootaxa 682:1–1295

External links
 

hotei
Gastropods described in 1949